

In New Zealand, long distance walking or hiking for at least one overnight stay is known as tramping. There are a number of walkways in New Zealand, however most of these are relatively short and can be walked in a day or less.  Many are also an easy walk, with well formed footpaths.  However, some tracks require an overnight stay either because of the rugged country or the length of the track.

New Zealand has both public and private tramping tracks. Public tracks are managed by the Department of Conservation, Regional Councils or other authorities. They generally cross public land (including National Parks), or private land with negotiated public access. Access is free and in most cases unrestricted, although fees are payable for overnight stays in huts or camping.

Private tracks cross private land, with restricted fee-based access. Itineraries are generally fixed. Fees may cover things such as overnight accommodation, food and pack transportation.

Notable tramping tracks
Some of the tramping tracks have acquired names, with the most popular being called the Great Walks (GW).

North Island
The Hillary Trail
The Lake Waikaremoana Great Walk, around Lake Waikaremoana in Te Urewera National Park (GW)
The Pinnacles Walk/Kauaeranga Kauri Trail on Coromandel Peninsula
Northern Crossing of Tararua Range in the Tararua Range
Ruapehu Circuit
Southern Crossing of Tararua Range in the Tararua Range
Tongariro Alpine Crossing
Tongariro Northern Circuit (GW)
Te Araroa
Whanganui Journey (GW)
The Cape Brett Lighthouse walk

South Island
Abel Tasman Coast Track (GW) and Abel Tasman Inland Track in Abel Tasman National Park
Banks Track (private)
Copland Track
Dusky Track
George Sound Route
Greenstone Track
Heaphy Track (GW)
Hollyford Track
Hump Ridge Track
Kaikoura Coast Track (private)
Kaikoura Wilderness Walk (private)
Kepler Track (GW)
Milford Track (GW)
Mingha-Deception
Otago Central Rail Trail
Paringa Cattle Trail
Queen Charlotte Track
Rees-Dart Track
Routeburn Track (GW)
South Coast Track
St James Walkway
Travers-Sabine Circuit
Wangapeka Track
Te Araroa

Other islands
Rakiura Track (GW), Stewart Island/Rakiura
North-West Circuit
Southern Circuit

See also
Camping in New Zealand
List of rail trails#New Zealand

External links
Department of Conservation - Government department responsible for managing public land.
New Zealand Tramper - tramping related information.
 TopTravelPoint

 
Lists of hiking trails